St Mark's, Mayfair, is a Grade I listed building, a former Anglican place of worship in North Audley Street, in the Mayfair district of London.

History
St Mark's was built in 182528
as a response to the shortage of churches in the area. The population in Mayfair had grown with the demand for town houses by the aristocracy and the wealthy, as they moved in from the country.

The building was constructed in the Greek revival style to the designs of John Peter Gandy. Gandy produced most of his work in Neo-classical designs, with St Mark's being one of the finest examples.

In 1878 architect Arthur Blomfield made substantial changes to the church interior, introducing a Romanesque open roof structure, wall decoration and architectural detail. The  façade, together with the elegant porch, is known as one of the finest in London.

The church was listed Grade I in 1958. It was deconsecrated in 1974 and remained empty for many years, being included on English Heritage’s "Buildings at Risk" register for over 20 years. Hammer Holdings Limited successfully applied for planning permission to convert the building into a 'wellness centre' in 2006, but a campaign led by Lady Sainsbury succeeded in blocking the proposal.
It was subsequently acquired by One Events in 2009 to as a mixed-use venue. 

In July 2014 the building was acquired by Grosvenor Estates.

History as a place of worship
Edward Thomas Daniell, known for his watercolour paintings of the Near East and his etchings of Norfolk, was appointed to the curacy of the church in 1834.

During the Second World War, St Mark's became informally known as The American Church in London due to its proximity to the United States embassy and as a centre for American worshippers. It was visited by President Dwight Eisenhower and the political figure, diplomat and activist Eleanor Roosevelt when she was First Lady of the United States.

On the 29 September 1949, St. Mark's was the venue for the wedding of George Lascelles, 7th Earl of Harewood and pianist Marion Stein, which was attended by King George VI and other members of the royal family. A wedding anthem specially composed and conducted by Benjamin Britten was performed at the service.

The congregation dwindled during the 1950s and 1960s, until the church was declared redundant in 1974. It remained empty from 1975 to 1994. That year the Diocese of London allowed the use of the church by The Commonwealth Christian Fellowship led by Rod and Julie Anderson, who met there with a congregation of around 120 and provided an out-reach programme for anti-knife crime training for teenagers, home visits for elderly people and help for the homeless. The church was used in this way until 2008.

Between February and May 2015 the church hosted This Present House.

Music
St Mark's has musical associations with Victorian opera, with the opera oratorio singer Sir Charles Santley and also with the composer Sir Arthur Sullivan. J. W. Elliott, a former organist at the church, composed the tune "Day of Rest" for the hymn "O Jesus I Have Promised".

Both John Williams, the first Master of Music at the Tower of London, and Margaret Cobb, the first woman to play the organ at the BBC Proms at Royal Albert Hall, were organists at the church.

The church as a three-manual organ by J. W. Walker & Sons Ltd which has recently been re-commissioned. There are plans to re-develop the instrument, with the assistance of organ builders Bishop and Son. The original Rushworth and Dreaper organ was relocated to Holy Trinity Brompton. St Mark's has held concerts by the London Russian Music School and it has also been the venue for concerts by such musicians as violinist Nicola Benedetti, and other choirs and ensembles from the locality.

Recent history

The building has been used for other events, such as by Nike, The London Summer Show, London Fashion Week and by Grosvenor Estates.
Since November 2019 St Mark's has been 'Mercato Mayfair', a 'dog-friendly' 'cultural hub and sustainable community market' operated by Mercato Metropolitano.

References

Buildings and structures in Mayfair
Grade I listed churches in the City of Westminster
Neoclassical architecture in London
Neoclassical church buildings in England